The Denton Outlaws were a collegiate summer baseball team based in Denton, Texas, from 2005 to 2007. They played their home games at Falcon Field in Corinth, Texas. The team was quite competitive during their short time in the Texas Collegiate League. In 2005, they were the TCL Champions. In 2006, they won the Rogers Hornsby Division.

Disbandment
The Denton Outlaws were one of seven teams that were disbanded after the league filed a lawsuit because the teams tried to form a new league that were going to copycat that the TCL used. The Outlaws played their last season in 2007.

External links
 TCL Fan Forum

References

Texas Collegiate League teams
Defunct minor league baseball teams
Defunct baseball teams in Texas
Sports in Denton, Texas
Baseball teams disestablished in 2007
2007 disestablishments in Texas
Baseball teams established in 2005